Long Beach is an oceanfront city in Nassau County in New York, United States. It takes up a central section of the Long Beach Barrier Island, which is the westernmost of the outer barrier islands off Long Island's South Shore. As of the 2020 Census, the city's population was 35,029, up from the 2019 estimate of 33,454. It was incorporated in 1922, and is nicknamed "The City by the Sea" (the Latin form, Civitas ad mare, is the city's motto). The Long Beach Barrier Island is surrounded by Reynolds Channel to the north, east and west, and the Atlantic Ocean to the south.

In 2022, Long Beach was named the best East Coast beach town for a summer getaway by Time Out magazine.

History

Pre-settlement 
The city of Long Beach's first inhabitants were the Algonquian-speaking Lenape, who sold the area to English colonists in 1643. From that time, while the barrier island was used by baymen and farmers for fishing and harvesting salt hay, no one lived there year-round for more than two centuries. The bark Mexico, carrying Irish immigrants to New York, ran ashore on New Year's Day.

Austin Corbin, a builder from Brooklyn, was the first to attempt to develop the island as a resort. He formed a partnership with the Long Island Rail Road (LIRR) to finance the New York and Long Beach Railroad Co., which laid track from Lynbrook to Long Beach in 1880. That same year, Corbin opened Long Beach Hotel, a row of 27 cottages along a  strip of beach, which he claimed was the world's largest hotel. In its first season, the railroad brought 300,000 visitors to Long Island. By the next spring, tracks had been laid the length of the island, but they were removed in 1894 after repeated washouts from winter storms.

20th century
In 1906, William H. Reynolds, a 39-year-old real estate developer and former state senator, became involved in the area. Reynolds had already developed four Brooklyn neighborhoods (Bedford–Stuyvesant, Borough Park, Bensonhurst, and South Brownsville), as well as Coney Island's Dreamland, the world's largest amusement park at the time. Reynolds also owned a theatre and produced plays.

He gathered investors, and acquired the oceanfront from private owners and the rest of the island from the Town of Hempstead in 1907; he planned to build a boardwalk, homes, and hotels. Reynolds had a herd of elephants marched in from Dreamland, ostensibly to help build the Long Beach Boardwalk; he had created an effective publicity stunt. To ensure that Long Beach lived up to his billing it "The Riviera of the East", he required each building to be constructed in an "eclectic Mediterranean style", with white stucco walls and red-clay tile roofs. He built a theatre called Castles by the Sea, with the largest dance floor in the world, for dancers Vernon and Irene Castle.

After Reynolds' corporation went bankrupt in 1918, the restrictions were lifted. The new town attracted wealthy business people and entertainers from New York and Hollywood.

On July 29, 1907, a fire broke out at the Long Beach Hotel and burned it to the ground. Of the 800 guests, eight were injured by jumping from windows, and one woman died. The fire was blamed on defective electric wiring. A church, several cottages, and the bathing pavilion were also destroyed. Trunks belonging to the guests, which had been piled on the sand to form "dressing rooms", were looted by thieves. A dozen waiters and others were apprehended by the police, who recovered $20,000 worth of jewelry and other stolen property.

The community became an incorporated village in 1913 and a city in 1922.

In 1923, the prohibition agents known simply as Izzy and Moe raided the Nassau Hotel and arrested three men for bootlegging. In 1930, five Long Beach Police officers were charged with offering a bribe to a United States Coast Guard officer to allow liquor to be landed. The police had another problem a year later in the summer of 1931, when a beachcomber found the body of a young woman named Starr Faithfull, who had drowned. She had left behind a suicide note, but others believed she had been murdered, and the circumstances of her death were never resolved. Corruption became rampant in Long Beach by then; in 1922, the state Legislature designated Long Beach a city, and William H. Reynolds was elected the first mayor. Soon afterward, Reynolds was indicted on charges of misappropriating funds. When he was found guilty, the clock in the tower at city hall was stopped in protest. When a judge released Reynolds from jail later that year on appeal, almost the entire population turned out to greet him, and the clock was turned back on.

On November 15, 1939, Mayor Louis F. Edwards was fatally shot by a police officer in front of his home. Officer Alvin Dooley, a member of the police motorcycle squad and the mayor's own security detail, killed Edwards after losing his bid for PBA president to a candidate the mayor supported. Jackson Boulevard was later renamed Edwards Boulevard in honor of the late mayor. After the murder, the city residents passed legislation to adopt a city manager system, which still exists to this day. The city manager is hired by and reports to the City Council.

In the 1940s, José Ferrer, Zero Mostel, Mae West, and other famous actors performed at local theaters. John Barrymore, Humphrey Bogart, Clara Bow, James Cagney, Cab Calloway, Jack Dempsey, Lillian Roth, Rudolph Valentino, and Florenz Ziegfeld lived in Long Beach for decades.

By the 1940s and 1950s, with the advent of cheap air travel attracting tourists to more distant places, and air-conditioning to provide year-round comfort, Long Beach had become primarily a bedroom community for commuters to New York City. It still attracted many summer visitors into the 1970s. The rundown boardwalk hotels were used for temporary housing for welfare recipients and the elderly until a scandal around 1970 led to many of the homes losing their licenses. At that time, government agencies were also "warehousing" in such hotels many patients released from larger mental hospitals. They were supposed to be cared for in small-scale community centers. The  boardwalk had a small amusement park at the foot of Edwards Boulevard until the 1980s. In the late 1960s, the boardwalk and amusement park area was a magnet for youth from around Long Island, until a police crackdown on drug trafficking ended that. A few businesses remained on the boardwalk, attracting bicyclists, joggers, walkers, and people-watchers.

Beginning in the 1980s and accelerating in the 1990s, Long Beach began an urban renewal, with new housing, new businesses, and other improvements. Today, the city is again a popular bedroom community, for people working in New York who want the quiet beach atmosphere. With summer come local youths and college students and young adults who rent bungalows on the West End; they frequent the local bars and clubs along West Beech Street. Just behind the boardwalk near the center of the city, however, vacant lots now occupy several blocks that once housed hotels, bathhouses, and the amusement park. Because attempts to attract development (including, at one time, Atlantic City-style casinos) to this potential "superblock" have not yet borne fruit, the lots constitute the city's largest portion of unused land.

21st century
On October 29, 2012, Hurricane Sandy struck Long Beach. As a result of flooding, hundreds of vehicles were destroyed and houses suffered various levels of damage. The estimated cost of all the damage was over $250 million. The city was without power and running water for two weeks after the storm. The boardwalk was also destroyed during the storm. The city began rebuilding the boardwalk with grants from FEMA and the State of New York. The first two-block section of the new Long Beach boardwalk reopened on July 26, 2013, and the entire boardwalk opened on October 25, 2013. The final costs of rebuilding the boardwalk were $44 million, of which ca. $39 million were FEMA grants and the final $4.4 million were reimbursed by the state.

Geography

Of its total area,  is land, and the rest is water.

Long Beach Barrier Island

The city is on a barrier island of the South Shore of Long Island. It shares the island with East Atlantic Beach, Atlantic Beach to the west and Lido Beach and Point Lookout to the east.

Climate
Long Beach has a humid subtropical climate (Cfa) under the Köppen climate classification, with humid hot summers and cool winters. It is one of the northernmost locations in this climate zone, allowing for the growth of warmer climate plants like Mimosa, Crape Myrtle, Southern Magnolia, and Sweetgum often seen further south. It is in plant hardiness zone 7b, like coastal Maryland. Precipitation is evenly distributed year-round, mostly in the form of rain although snowfall occurs each winter. Long Beach is vulnerable to tropical cyclones. Its climate is tempered by the influence of the Atlantic Ocean.

Cityscape

Unlike most suburban communities near New York City, Long Beach is a high-density community. Fewer than 40% of the homes are detached houses, and the city ranks as the 35th-densest community in the United States. The city is divided into the West End, home to many small bungalow and some large houses, and the East End.

East of New York Avenue, the island is wider between the bay and ocean and is home to larger more expansive family houses. There is the city's boardwalk, which begins at New York Avenue and ends at Neptune Boulevard. Along the boardwalk are many apartment buildings and condos. The main commercial strip is Park Avenue, which narrows into a small residential strip west of New York Avenue.

Neighborhoods
The city of Long Beach contains the following neighborhoods:
 Central District – The area between Magnolia Boulevard and Monroe Boulevard, known for its diverse population and historical hip hop scene. Long Beach's City Hall is located in this area as well as the Martin Luther King Center and Emergency Department at Long Beach.
 North Park – The area north of Park Avenue, between the LIRR Station and Long Beach Road. Home to the Long Beach Housing Authority, M Block, and Pine Houses.
 The East End – The neighborhood between Monroe Boulevard and Maple Boulevard or Curley Street, significant for its historical immigrant population.
 The Canals – The area comprising several streets running north-south, with 4 parallel canals originating from Reynolds Channel. The canals begin on Forrester Street and end on Curley Street, each canal except for Bob Jones Canal is traversed by a short bridge carrying East Pine Street.
 The President Streets – The area comprising 9 north-south avenues of which 5 are named after former U.S. presidents, with the 4 exceptions of Atlantic, Belmont, and Mitchell Avenues, and Pacific Boulevard; Pacific Boulevard connects directly from Park Avenue to East Broadway, a parallel road to the south.
 Kennedy Plaza – An area in the Central District, at the intersection of National Boulevard and West Chester Street.
 The Walks – An area comprising extremely narrow sidewalks between houses. Each walk is named after a month.
 The West End – This area is home to many small bungalows and large houses close to one other, along small narrow streets. These streets, named after U.S. states, run from the beach to the bay, until they meet East Atlantic Beach at Nevada Avenue.
 Westholme – The neighborhood between New York Avenue and Magnolia Boulevard.
 Pine Houses – Popularly known as “P Block,”it is the housing project complex quartered in East Pine Street between Rev JJ Evans Blvd and Long Beach Road. It is infamous for being the historical breeding and battle ground for Long Beach hip hop artists, and is home to the P Block Bloods.
 M Block – Area in the Central district consisting of Monroe Blvd, the partition of East Bay Drive where the Urgentcare building and abandoned hospital are located, and the area between Pine Houses and Market Street. This area is known for its notable population of Caribbean and Latino migrants that moved to the neighborhood around the 1960s. It is infamous for housing the M Block faction of the Almighty Latin Kings street gang from the late 70s to now.

National Register of Historic Places

Multiple sites in Long Beach are listed on the National Register of Historic Places, including:

 Barkin House
 Cobble Villa
 Granada Towers
 House at 226 West Penn Street
 Pauline Felix House
 Samuel Vaisberg House
 United States Post Office

Landmarks and historic districts

The city of Long Beach contains the following landmarks and historic district:

 9/11 Memorial
 Holocaust Memorial at Kennedy Plaza
 John F. Kennedy Memorial
 Red Brick District
 Shine's Bar on the West End
 House of Maguire

Museums and community centers
 House at 226 West Penn Street (also known as Long Beach Historical & Preservation Society Museum)
 Martin Luther King Community Center

Demographics 

The 2010 U.S. census determined there were 33,275 people residing in the city, and the 2019 American Community Survey estimated the population increased to 33,454. At census of 2000, there were 35,462 people, 14,923 households, and 8,103 families residing in the city.

In 2019 there were an average of 2.31 persons per household, and the median household income was $97,022. Long Beach had a per capita income of $53,579 from 2015-2019 and 6.7% of its population lived at or below the poverty line. In 2000, there were 14,923 households, out of which 21.6% had children under the age of 18 living with them, 40.0% were married couples living together, 10.8% had a female householder with no husband present, and 45.7% were non-families. 36.7% of all households were made up of individuals, and 10.7% had someone living alone who was 65 years of age or older. The average household size was 2.26 and the average family size was 3.02.

In the city, the population was spread out, with 18.5% under the age of 18, 6.6% from 18 to 24, 34.4% from 25 to 44, 23.8% from 45 to 64, and 16.7% who were 65 years of age or older. The median age was 40 years. For every 100 females, there were 92.7 males. For every 100 females age 18 and over, there were 89.6 males. The median income for a household in the city was $56,289, and the median income for a family was $68,222. Males had a median income of $50,995 versus $40,739 for females. The per capita income for the city was $31,069. About 6.3% of families and 9.4% of the population were below the poverty line, including 13.2% of those under age 18 and 10.7% of those age 65 or over.

Race and ethnicity 
The racial and ethnic makeup of the city of Long Beach was 73.2% non-Hispanic white, 7.5% Black or African American, 0.2% American Indian or Alaska Native, 3.6% Asian, 2.8% two or more races, and 13.9% Hispanic and Latin American of any race. Out of the total population, 52.2% were female and 13.4% of the total population was foreign-born from 2015-2019. In 2000, the racial makeup of the city was 84.20% White, 6.18% African American, 0.21% Native American, 2.32% Asian, 0.08% Pacific Islander, 4.75% from other races, and 2.26% from two or more races. Hispanic or Latino of any race were 12.80% of the population.

Religion 
According to Sperling's BestPlaces, 67.7% of the population of Long Beach were religious as of 2021. The majority of the religious population are Christian and the Catholic Church is the largest single denomination. The second largest Christian group is Protestantism and the single largest Protestant denomination as of 2021 was Lutheranism. The second largest religion practiced in the city is Judaism, followed by Islam. Eastern faiths including Hinduism and Buddhism are also prevalent in the city, while the remainder of the population is irreligious or atheist.

Government

Donna Gayden is the current city manager. The previous city manager was Jack Schnirman, who was elected to Nassau County Comptroller in 2018. Five members serve the city council, currently:
 John Bendo (D), City Council President
 Karen McInnis (D), City Council Vice President
 Michael A. Delury
 Scott J. Mandel (D)
 Elizabeth M. Treston (D)

Public safety and emergency services
The city has a comprehensive emergency services structure consisting of multiple organizations, including the Long Beach Police Department, Long Beach Fire Department, Long Beach Lifeguards, Animal Control and Emergency Medical Services (LBFD), Long Beach Auxiliary Police Department.

City municipalities
The city of Long Beach has an extensive parks and recreation program led by Joseph Brand II. Within the offerings include, but are not limited to the Ice Arena, Summer Camps, Pool, Races and is most notoriously known for its Ocean Beach Park. Long Beach’s Ocean Beach Park (OBP) is managed under the supervision of Nichole Landry. All city parks and recreation programs are found online at longbeachny.gov.

Education

Public schools
The Long Beach City School District serves the city of Long Beach and parts of the Town of Hempstead with one primary high school, one middle school, one prekindergarten, and four elementary schools. They also operate an "alternative" high school at the NIKE missile site on a campus shared with the district's transportation services.

The schools of Long Beach City School District are:

 Long Beach Pre-Kindergarten
 West Elementary School
 East Elementary School
 Lido Elementary School
 Lindell Elementary School
 Long Beach Middle School
 Long Beach High School
 Harriet Eisman Community School

Private schools
 Long Beach Catholic Regional School
 Mesivta of Long Beach

Post-secondary education
 Rabbinical College of Long Island

Public libraries
The Long Beach Public Library serves greater Long Beach with the main library downtown and two branch libraries at Point Lookout and the West End.

Transportation

Buses and trolleys
Long Beach Bus operates a 24-hour municipal bus service with five routes, including three routes serving the city, one overnight circulator route, and one route extending service to Lido Beach and Point Lookout. Long Beach Bus also operates two seasonal trolley routes, East Loop and West Loop.

Nassau Inter-County Express (NICE) has two bus routes that originate in Long Beach. The n15 and n33 travel to Roosevelt Field and Far Rockaway, via Rockville Centre and Atlantic Beach, respectively. The n33 does not provide service wholly within Long Beach.

Railroad

The Long Island Rail Road operates a terminal station at Park Place and Park Avenue with service on the railroad's Long Beach Branch. All other public transportation services in Long Beach converge at this terminal. Most trains run to Penn Station (Manhattan) or Atlantic Terminal (Brooklyn).

Notable people
 Lil Peep (born Gustav Elijah Åhr, 1996-2017), rapper and singer, raised in Long Beach from 2001 to 2016.
 MF Doom (born Daniel Dumile, 1971-2020), hip-hop recording artist/producer, raised in Long Beach.
 Larry Brown (born 1940), basketball star and coach, graduated from Long Beach High School.
 Mike Portnoy, drummer of Dream Theater
 Loring Buzzell (1927–1959), music publisher and record label executive.
 Vernon and Irene Castle, dance pioneers who introduced dances such as tango and foxtrot to the US in the 1910s; they lived in Long Beach and operated a nightclub called "Castles By the Sea".
 Don & Juan, R&B vocal duo active in the 50s and 60s.
 Alan Colmes (1950–2017), political analyst formerly on Hannity & Colmes, resided in Long Beach
 Billy Crystal (born 1948), film and television actor who was raised in Long Beach
 Amy Fisher (born 1974), also known as the "Long Island Lolita"
 Maurice Mitchell (born 1979), is an American activist and Musician
 Mike Francesa (born 1954), WFAN 660AM New York City radio host, was born and raised in Long Beach.
 Larry Garrison, film and television producer, journalist
 James "Scottie" Graham (born 1969) former Ohio State and NFL player, grew up in Long Beach and graduated from the high school
 Rocky Graziano (1919–1990), boxer, lived in Long Beach for many years
 Smith Hart (1948-2017), professional wrestler, member of the Hart wrestling family.
 Eleanor Holm (1913–2004), Olympic swimmer, movie star, star of the Aquacade, grew up in Long Beach
 Richard Jaeckel (1926–1997), television and film actor who starred in The Dirty Dozen, was born in Long Beach
 Derek Jeter (born 1974), former New York Yankees shortstop and team captain since 2003, lived in Long Beach
 Joan Jett (born 1958), rock singer
 Pete Johnson (born 1954), running back who played eight seasons in the NFL, primarily with the Cincinnati Bengals
 Hal Kanter (1918–2011), TV writer
 John Lannan (born 1984), pitcher for the New York Mets
 Allard K. Lowenstein (1929–1980), congressman, anti-Vietnam War leader, and liberal activist who represented it in Congress in the late 1960s
 Charlie McAvoy (born 1997), defenseman for the Boston Bruins
 Audrey Peppe (1917–1992), figure skater, member of three US Olympic teams, runner-up for the national championship.
 Edgar J. Scherick (1924–2002), Creator of ABC's Wide World of Sports (American TV program), network television executive, film producer, and Emmy Award winning television producer, grew up in Long Beach and graduated from Long Beach High School.
 Tommy Gunn , rapper, record producer, MF DOOM’s mentor, and member of Long Island rap collective, Monsta Island Czars, under the moniker, “Megalon.”

References

External links

 City of Long Beach, NY
 Long Beach NY Historical Society
 The Long Beach Chamber of Commerce
 Long Beach Waterfront Warriors Beach Day

 
Cities in New York (state)
Populated coastal places in New York (state)
Cities in Nassau County, New York
Cities in the New York metropolitan area